The Cathedral Basilica of the Immaculate Conception  also called Santa Fe de Antioquia Cathedral It is a cathedral church of Catholic worship dedicated to the Virgin Mary under the title of the Immaculate Conception. The building is located on the northeastern side of the main square of the town and city of Santa Fe de Antioquia (Antioquia) in the South American country of Colombia. The cathedral is the principal church of the Roman Catholic Archdiocese of Santa Fe de Antioquia, seat of the Archbishop and Metropolitan Chapter.

Description
Designed by Fray Domingo de Petres, who also designed the Cathedral of Bogota, style can be located within the neoclassical, with details of popular baroque; It has a single tower measuring 47 meters high, is rectangular and its interior is of three ships with semicircular arches on Tuscan columns. Colonial valuable artistic works housed inside stand out.

The historical sector (including the cathedral) of Santa Fe de Antioquia, the old capital of the department of Antioquia, was declared a National Monument of Colombia by Law 163 of December 30, 1959.

See also
Roman Catholicism in Colombia
Cathedral Basilica of the Immaculate Conception

References

Roman Catholic cathedrals in Colombia
Santa Fe de Antioquia
Roman Catholic churches completed in 1837
Basilica churches in Colombia
19th-century Roman Catholic church buildings in Colombia